Baztab ( meaning reflection) is an Iranian, Persian language, Tehran-based news website. The English service of this site has published since January 2007. Although Baztab is an anti-reformist website, it sometimes criticizes Mahmoud Ahmadinejad's government's policies and mostly unveils corruption cases inside the government. Baztab is widely believed to have close ties with (or even managed by) Mohsen Rezaee, conservative politician, current secretary of the Expediency Discernment Council and former Revolutionary Guards chief.

Baztab was filtered and suspended for a few weeks in October 2005 for allegedly insulting the former Supreme Council of National Security's Chief, Hassan Rohani. Baztab's suspension was rescinded after the site's editor, Foad Sadeghi, stepped down.

February 2007: The website is banned and filtered in Iran for the second time.

September 2007: A court in Tehran orders the website to be shut down indefinitely for threatening the national security of Iran by "exaggerating the foreign threat to Iran and the possibility of war."

September 2007: Tabnak news website goes online from Tehran. It is run almost entirely by the same team and follows the same policies. The website is almost identical to Baztab, even in its design.

Baztab came back online in 2011 with the key people of the very first version of that and a minor change in the domain's address. It was then blocked by the Iranian authorities and was attacked by the pro-regime hackers many times while as of February 2013 still struggling to be up and running.

See also
 Media of Iran

References

External links
 Official website

2007 establishments in Iran
Iranian news websites
Mass media in Tehran